Firleigh Farms is a historic equine and fox hunting estate located near Southern Pines, Moore County, North Carolina. Firleigh was built in 1923–1924, and is a two-story, Colonial Revival style frame dwelling. It consists of a five-bay main block and a two-story ell forming an "L"-shaped plan. It was built as a winter-season hunting box for Augustine Healy and his wife, Jeanette Reid Healy.  Also on the property is a contributing three-vehicle garage/servants's quarters.

It was added to the National Register of Historic Places in 2014.

References

Houses on the National Register of Historic Places in North Carolina
Colonial Revival architecture in North Carolina
Houses completed in 1924
Houses in Moore County, North Carolina
National Register of Historic Places in Moore County, North Carolina